The Couchiching Terriers were a Junior A ice hockey team from Rama, Ontario, Canada from Lake Couchiching.  The team originated in neighbouring Orillia, Ontario, and played in the Ontario Junior A Hockey League.  The Terriers were 1985 Centennial Cup National Champions and three time Dudley Hewitt Cup Central Canadian Champions (1984, 1985, 1986).  The team folded in 2010 when offered a buyout from the league.

History
The Junior A team that now boasts the name "Terriers" was previously known as the Orillia Travelways and was a member of the Mid-Ontario Junior B Hockey League from at least 1971 to 1978. The Mid-Ontario league was discontinued in 1978 and the Travelways were added to the Central Junior B Hockey League at that time. They moved up to the Tier II Junior A ranks for the first time in 1981, joining the Ontario Junior Hockey League, and won the 1985 Centennial Cup as the best Junior A team in Canada.

They are not connected with the Orillia Terriers, a different club which competed in the OHA Senior A and Intermediate A ranks from 1968 to 1982.

Orillia was the league's top team, winning three straight playoff championships, but dropped out in 1986 when faulty trusses forced the closing of the Orillia Community Centre.  During their absence the Junior A league collapsed, so the team returned to the Central Junior B league in 1987 under the name "Laidlaws" (their sponsor, the Travelways bus line was acquired by Laidlaw transportation). When Laidlaw dropped the sponsorship, they returned to their "Terriers" name in 1989 and returned to Tier II in 1993 when the Central loop became the Ontario Provincial Junior A Hockey League. The Terriers won the new league's first playoff championship in 1994.

At the time of their folding, the Terriers were the official farm team of the Barrie Colts and the parent club of the Alliston Hornets.  The Terriers folded due to financial troubles combined with a lack of arena time.  The rink in Rama wanted too much money for ice time, so the Terriers wished to move back to Orillia—their original home.  Not enough ice time was available at the Orillia rink due to minor hockey needs.  The Terriers also wanted to move to Orillia due to the town's deeper interest in junior hockey.  Ticket sales in recent years in Rama were weak, but in Orillia, where the Terriers played a handful of games, the arena was near, if not full.

The Terriers played in the 2007-08 .

Season-by-season results

Playoffs
1982 DNQ
1983 Lost Final
Orillia Travelways defeated Markham Waxers 4-games-to-3
Orillia Travelways defeated Newmarket Flyers 4-games-to-3
North York Rangers defeated Orillia Travelways 4-games-to-none
1984 Won League, Won OHA Buckland Cup, Won Dudley Hewitt Cup, Lost 1984 Centennial Cup
Orillia Travelways defeated Markham Waxers 4-games-to-none
Orillia Travelways defeated North York Rangers 4-games-to-none
Orillia Travelways defeated Dixie Beehives 4-games-to-1 OJHL CHAMPIONS
Orillia Travelways defeated Rayside-Balfour Canadians (NOJHL) 3-games-to-1 BUCKLAND CUP CHAMPIONS
Orillia Travelways defeated Pembroke Lumber Kings (CJHL) 4-games-to-none DUDLEY HEWITT CUP CHAMPIONS
Weyburn Red Wings (SJHL) defeated Orillia Travelways 4-games-to-3
1985 Won League, Won OHA Buckland Cup, Won Dudley Hewitt Cup, Won 1985 Centennial Cup
Orillia Travelways defeated Whitby Lawmen 4-games-to-1
Orillia Travelways defeated Markham Waxers 4-games-to-none
Orillia Travelways defeated Aurora Tigers 4-games-to-none OJHL and BUCKLAND CUP CHAMPIONS
First in 1985 Centennial Cup round robin (3-0) DUDLEY HEWITT CUP CHAMPIONS
Orillia Travelways defeated Penticton Knights (BCJHL) 4-2 in final CENTENNIAL CUP CHAMPIONS
1986 Won League, Won OHA Buckland Cup, Won Dudley Hewitt Cup, Lost 1986 Centennial Cup semi-final
Orillia Travelways defeated Newmarket Flyers 4-games-to-1
Orillia Travelways defeated Markham Waxers 4-games-to-1 OJHL CHAMPIONS
Orillia Travelways defeated Onaping Falls Huskies (NOJHL) 4-games-to-2 BUCKLAND CUP CHAMPIONS
Orillia Travelways defeated Brockville Braves (CJHL) 4-games-to-3 DUDLEY HEWITT CUP CHAMPIONS
Third in 1986 Centennial Cup round robin (1-2)
Penticton Knights (BCJHL) defeated Orillia Travelways 7-3 in semi-final

Notable alumni
Fred Brathwaite
Tony Hrkac
Ethan Moreau
Tim Mason (National Lawn Bowling champion)
Brent Burns
Daniel Girardi

External links
Terriers Webpage

Ontario Provincial Junior A Hockey League teams
2010 disestablishments in Ontario